Lakeside is the name of some places in the U.S. state of Texas:
Lakeside, San Patricio County, Texas
Lakeside, Tarrant County, Texas

See also 
Lakeside City, Texas, Archer County